The 2018 BOLL Warsaw FIM Speedway Grand Prix of Poland was the first race of the 2018 Speedway Grand Prix season. It took place on May 12 at the Stadion Narodowy in Warsaw, Poland.

Riders 
The Speedway Grand Prix Commission nominated Krzysztof Kasprzak as the wild card, and Maksym Drabik and Bartosz Smektała both as Track Reserves.

Results 
The Grand Prix was won by Tai Woffinden, who beat Maciej Janowski, Fredrik Lindgren and Artem Laguta in the final. It was the eighth Grand Prix win of Woffinden's career, taking him level with Leigh Adams in seventh on the all-time list.

Lindgren had initially top scored with 12 points during the qualifying heats, and despite finishing third in the final, he topped the overall standings with 16 points, one ahead of Woffinden.

Heat details

Intermediate classification

References 

Poland
Speedway Grand Prix
Sports competitions in Warsaw
Grand